The Ehuang Yangtze River Bridge crosses the Yangtze River in Hubei, China. The bridge carries traffic on China National Highway 106 between Echeng, Ezhou south of the river and Huangzhou, Huanggang to the north. Construction of the bridge started in 1999 and it was completed in 2002.

See also
 Yangtze River bridges and tunnels
 List of largest cable-stayed bridges

References

External links
 https://web.archive.org/web/20160304051121/http://en.ccccltd.cn/business/infrastructureconstruction/bridge/201011/t20101111_1508.html

Cable-stayed bridges in China
Bridges in Hubei
Bridges completed in 2002
Bridges over the Yangtze River
2002 establishments in China